The 1968 King's Cup finals were held from November 20 to December 2, 1968, in Bangkok.  This was the first edition of the international football competition.

The tournament featured a Group Allocation stage, that was used as a draw mechanism for the group stages. The top two in each three team group advanced to the semi-finals.

Indonesia won the tournament defeating Burma in the final. The hosts Thailand, Malaysia, Laos and Singapore were the other teams to play in this tournament.

Fixtures and results

Group allocation stage

Group 1

Group 2

Semi-finals

3rd-place match

Final

Winner

References

King's Cup
Kings Cup, 1968
Kings Cup, 1968
International association football competitions hosted by Thailand